Terrorvision or TerrorVision can refer to:

 Terrorvision, a British rock band
 TerrorVision, a 1986 horror-comedy movie.
 TerrorVision (album), a 2018 album by Belgian death metal band Aborted.

See also
Terravision (disambiguation)